The 1995 Rugby World Cup Final was the final match of the 1995 Rugby World Cup, played in South Africa. The match was played at Ellis Park Stadium, Johannesburg on 24 June 1995 between the host nation, South Africa, and New Zealand.

South Africa won the match by three points in their first Rugby World Cup Final, which was also the first to require extra time. Unusually, the points were scored by only one player from each team, with Andrew Mehrtens of New Zealand scoring all 12 of the 'All Blacks' points, (three penalties and one drop goal) and Joel Stransky tallying all 15 points (three penalties and two drop goals) for the Springboks, including a drop goal in extra time, which sealed the victory and their first ever  Rugby World Cup title.

At the end of the match, South African President Nelson Mandela, wearing a number 6 Springbok rugby shirt and cap, presented the Webb Ellis Cup to the South African captain François Pienaar.

Path to the final
The final was contested by the hosts, South Africa, and New Zealand. Both teams finished at the top of their pools, both undefeated in the pool stages. South Africa defeated Western Samoa in the quarter finals, and then France in the semi-finals to reach the final; the 'All Blacks' defeated Scotland in the quarter-finals, and England in the semi-finals, a game in which Jonah Lomu famously scored four tries.

Going into the final, New Zealand had led the tournament in points scored, outscoring their opponents 315–104, while South Africa had outscored their opponents 129–55. The high scoring 'All Blacks' had been led by Lomu, who had the record for most tries in a world cup match summary.

First half
No tries were scored but this did not diminish the tense atmosphere and climactic finish. The South Africans played a largely defensive game. Due to the strength of flanker Ruben Kruger and No. 8 Mark Andrews plus scrum-half Joost van der Westhuizen, the expansive attacks from New Zealand were repeatedly closed down. Andrew Mehrtens opened the scoring with a penalty after six minutes to give New Zealand a 3–0 lead. A Joel Stransky penalty put South Africa on the scoreboard after 11 minutes. Mehrtens and Stransky swapped successful penalty kicks. Following a period of pressure, Stransky landed a 32nd minute drop goal to give South Africa a 9–6 lead at half time.

Second half
The All Blacks levelled the scores at 9–9 with a Mehrtens drop goal after 55 minutes. Though All Blacks fly-half Andrew Mehrtens almost kicked a late drop goal, the score remained unchanged at full time, forcing the game into extra time for the first time in a Rugby World Cup final.

Extra time
Extra time began with South Africa needing to take the initiative, due to the ruling that if extra time finished with scores still level with no side having scored more tries than the other, then the team with the better overall disciplinary record during the tournament would win. But early in the first half, the Springboks were penalized for chasing a Stransky kick from an offside position. From just inside the half-way line, Mehrtens kicked truly to give New Zealand a 12–9 lead. As half-time approached, Stransky put a high kick for his teammates to chase, and from the resultant play referee Morrison penalized the All Blacks for diving to the ground near the tackle, and right on the stroke of half-time Stransky levelled the scores at 12–12. Seven minutes from time it was Stransky who scored the final point. From thirty metres out he struck the drop goal, securing South Africa's victory and the Rugby World Championship crown.

Inspiration 

What happened after the match would become an iconic moment in the history of sport. Nelson Mandela, wearing a Springbok rugby shirt and cricket cap, presented the William Webb Ellis Cup to South African captain François Pienaar to the delight of the capacity crowd. The moment is thought by some to be one of the most famous finals of any sporting event in recent years. In 2002, Mandela's presentation was listed at number 70 in a list of the 100 Greatest Sporting Moments on a British television programme.

However, the after match mood soured a little during the end of the tournament banquet when South Africa's rugby president, Louis Luyt said in his speech that "There were no true world champions in the 1987 and 1991 World Cups because South Africa were not there." This claim that South Africa were the first "true world champions" led the New Zealand team to walk out of the dinner.

Match details

Depictions in media
Mandela and Pienaar's involvement in the 1995 World Cup became the subject of Clint Eastwood's Oscar-nominated 2009 film Invictus, featuring Morgan Freeman as Mandela and Matt Damon as Pienaar (and including Chester Williams, a member of the 1995 champions and the only black player on the 1995 Springbok squad, as a technical consultant), with the final as the climactic scene and filmed on location at Ellis Park.

References

Final
1995
Final
Final
New Zealand national rugby union team matches
South Africa national rugby union team matches
History of rugby union matches between New Zealand and South Africa